Undark was a trade name for luminous paint made with a mixture of radioactive radium and zinc sulfide, as produced by the U.S. Radium Corporation between 1917 and 1938.  It was used primarily in watch and clock dials. The people working in the industry who applied the radioactive paint became known as the Radium Girls, because many of them became ill and some died from exposure to the radiation emitted by the radium contained within the product. The product was the direct cause of radium jaw in the dial painters.  Undark was also available as a kit for general consumer use and marketed as glow-in-the-dark paint.

Similar products
Mixtures similar to Undark, consisting of radium and zinc sulphide were used by other companies. Trade names include:
 Luna used by the Radium Dial Company, a division of Standard Chemical Company
and
 Marvelite used by Cold Light Manufacturing Company (a subsidiary of the Radium Company of Colorado)

See also
 Self-powered lighting
 Radium dials

Further reading
 Clark, Claudia. (1987). Radium Girls: Women and Industrial Health Reform, 1910-1935. University of North Carolina Press. .
 Ross Mullner. (1999) Deadly Glow. The Radium Dial Worker Tragedy.  American Public Health Association. .
 National Council on Radiation Protection and Measurements. "Radiation Exposure from Consumer Products and Miscellaneous Sources. NCRP Report No. 56. 1977.
 Scientific American (Macklis RM, The great radium scandal. Sci.Am. 1993 Aug: 269(2):94-99)

External links
 Roger Russel - Radium Dials
 Damninteresting.com - Undark and the Radium Girls
 orau.org - Radioluminescent paint
 orau.org - Photo gallery of radioluminescent items
 New York Times - "A Glow in the Dark, and a Lesson in Scientific Peril", Denise Grady, October 6, 1998

Luminescence
Radium
Paints
Brand name materials